The following are the national records in track cycling in New Zealand maintained by New Zealand's national cycling federation.

Men

Women

References
General
New Zealand Track records 10 April 2022 updated
New Zealand One Hour Track records 31 August 2019 updated
Specific

External links
Cycling New Zealand official website

New Zealand
Records
Track cycling
track cycling